This is a list of renamed places in the Gambia.
 Bathurst → Banjul (1973)
 Georgetown → Janjanbureh
 James Island → Kunta Kinteh Island (2011)
 MacCarthy Island → Janjanbureh Island (1995)

See also 
 Lists of renamed places

References 

Geography of the Gambia
History of the Gambia
Gambia
Gambia, renamed places
Renamed places
Gambia
Gambia